= Poor Robin Spring =

Spring in Wilcox County, United States of America

Coordinates: 32°0′45.64″N 83°17′56.57″W

Poor Robin Spring is a spring in the U.S. state of Georgia.

According to tradition, Poor Robin Spring was named after one Native American chieftain Robin, who believed the spring's waters held healing qualities.
